The Owen Sound NorthStars are a Canadian Senior box lacrosse team.  The team played in the City of Owen Sound, Ontario, Canada and participate in the OLA Senior B Lacrosse League.  As the Woodsmen they were two-time Presidents Cup National Champions, two-time National Silver Medalists, two-time National Bronze Medalists, and seven-time Ontario Lacrosse Association Senior B Champions.

History

Founded in 2001, the Woodsmen follow the Owen Sound lacrosse tradition laid down by the 1951 Mann Cup Champion Owen Sound Crescents and the four-time Presidents Cup champion Owen Sound North Stars.

Their first season was a success from the get-go.  After coming in second overall in the regular season, the Woodsmen ended up winning the Playoff Championship in only their first season.  The Woodsmen went to the Presidents Cup tournament as the Ontario representative and finished with the bronze medal.

In 2002, the Woodsmen again finished in second place with only three losses.  In the playoffs, the Woodsmen won the playoffs for the second straight year and made their second appearance at the Presidents Cup but did not place.

The 2003 season saw the Woodsmen finish first overall in the OLA and win their third straight playoff championship.  At their third straight Presidents Cup, the Woodsmen made it to the tournament final for the first time only to lose to the team they beat in the OLA final, the Kitchener-Waterloo Kodiaks.

In 2004, the Woodsmen made the OLA Finals for the fourth straight year after a stellar regular season in which they only lost once in sixteen games.  This year they met the upstart Barrie Lakeshores who shocked the three-time champions and won the league title.  Barrie was promoted to Major Series Lacrosse the next season.

The Owen Sound Woodsmen hosted the 2007 Presidents Cup tournament.  Despite a mediocre regular season in 2007, the Woodsmen made the right changes and went into the playoffs on a roll.  In the quarter-final round robin, the Woodsmen finished with a record of three wins and one loss against the Brooklin Merchants and Norwood Nitro.  In the league semi-final, the Woodsmen then beat the Merchants 2-games-to-none.  In the final, the Woodsmen were up against the Ajax-Pickering Rock, whom they defeated 3-games-to-none to win their fourth OLA championship.  At the Presidents Cup, the Woodsmen were shocked right out the door by the Ladner Pioneers of British Columbia 11-9.  The next night, the Woodsmen redeemed themselves by destroying the LaSalle Brasseurs of Quebec 18-3.  The next night, Owen Sound took on and defeated the Six Nations Sting of the Can-Am Senior B Lacrosse League  9-5.  In the final game of the round robin, the Woodsmen drew the Sherwood Park Outlaws of the Rocky Mountain Lacrosse League and lost to them 10-9.  Because of the loss, the 2-2 Woodsmen drew the Outlaws for the second straight night for the tournament semi-final.  With this chance at revenge and a birth into the National Final, the Woodsmen fell short and again lost to the Outlaws 10-9.  The loss allowed for a rematch of Owen Sound and Ladner for the National bronze medal match.  This time the Woodsmen got the upper hand and defeated the Pioneers 9-7 to win their third Presidents Cup medal.

In 2008, the defending league champions finished the regular season in second place with an 8-6-0 record.  In the league quarter-finals they defeated the Mohawks Stars 2-games-to-none with 17-4 and 16-11 wins.  In the semi-finals, the Woodsmen defeated the Centre-Wellington Aces 3-games-to-1, losing games one 6-4 then sweeping the next three 7-4, 5-3, 10-8.  In the league final, the Woodsmen swept the Brooklin Merchants 3-games-to-none with 10-5, 10-6, and 10-7 victories.  Next Owen Sound traveled to Sherwood Park, Alberta for the 2008 Presidents Cup.  In the first game, they defeated the Airdrie Knights of the Rocky Mountain Lacrosse League 8-5.  In game two, the Woodsmen defeated the host Sherwood Park Outlaws 11-5.  Then Owen Sound defeated the Tri-City Bandits of the West Coast Senior Lacrosse Association 8-4 to clinch first place in the round robin.  In the semi-final, the Woodsmen drew Tri-City again and routed them 11-2.  In the finals, something the Woodsmen had never won in their eight-year history, Owen Sound defeated Sherwood Park 11-5 to clinch their first National championship.  This marks Owen Sound's first Presidents Cup since the Owen Sound North Stars won it in 1991.

The 2009 season brought more good fortune on the Woodsmen.  After finishing first in the OLA with a 15-1-0 record, the Woodmen faced the Brooklin Merchants in the first round of the playoffs.  The Woodies swept the Merchants 3-games-to-none to advance to the league final.  In the finals, the Woodies swept the Peterborough-Norwood Nitros 3-games-to-none to win the Clare Levack Memorial Trophy for the third consecutive time and the sixth time since their first season.  The Woodies headed off to Ohsweken, Ontario for the 2009 Presidents Cup.  In the first game, the Woodies smoked the Okotoks Ascent Raiders of the RMLL 16-7.  They then beat the host Six Nations Sting of the Can-Am Senior B Lacrosse League 15-6.  In the third game, the Woodies clinched the first seed in their tournament division with a 10-5 win over the West Coast Senior Lacrosse Association's Tri-City Bandits.  The Woodies did not play many of their starters in a throw away fourth game of the round robin, and lost to the Niagara Hawks of the Can-Am League 14-12.  Finishing first overall, the Woodies met Six Nations in the semi-final, defeating them 14-6 to make the final.  In the finals, the Woodies met Tri-City again.  After taking a 7-2 lead in the first, the Woodies cruised to an 11-5 win to take their second straight Presidents Cup as National Champions.

The team changed their name to the NorthStars, in honour of the Owen Sound North Stars, in the fall of 2011.

Season-by-season results

Presidents Cup results

See also
OLA Senior B Lacrosse League
Presidents Cup (box lacrosse)

References

External links
Owen Sound NorthStars website

Ontario Lacrosse Association teams
Sport in Owen Sound